The 1940 Lonsdale by-election was held on 12 April 1940.  The by-election was held due to the succession to the peerage of the incumbent Conservative MP, David Lindsay.  It was won by the Conservative candidate Ian Fraser.

References

1940 elections in the United Kingdom
1940 in England
1940s in Lancashire
By-elections to the Parliament of the United Kingdom in Lancashire constituencies
Unopposed by-elections to the Parliament of the United Kingdom (need citation)
April 1940 events